Oleg Vyacheslavovich Vyugin (Russian: Вьюгин Олег Вячеславович, born July 29, 1952) is a Russian economist and Professor at the National Research University Higher School of Economics. He was formerly the head of the Russian Federal Financial Markets Service and chairman of the Moscow Exchange.

Education and early career

Mr. Vyugin graduated from the Moscow State University in 1974. In 1977 he completed his graduate studies in physics and mathematics the same university.

From to 1978  to 1988 Mr. Vyugin worked as an academic at various economic research institutes.

From 1989 to 1993, he was Chief Researcher at the Russian Academy of Sciences’ Institute of Economic Forecasting.

In 1993, Mr. Vyugin was appointed Head of the Macroeconomic Policy Department at the Russian Ministry of Finance. In 1994, he became a member of the board of the Ministry of Finance. From 1996 to 1999, he served as Deputy Minister of Finance, and in 1999 was appointed First Deputy Minister. 
In 1999, Mr. Vyugin became Chief Economist and Executive Vice President of Troika Dialog.

In 2002, he was appointed First Deputy Chairman of the Central Bank of Russia responsible for monetary policy.

Head of the Federal Financial Markets Service

On March 23, 2004, Mr. Vyugin was appointed Head of the Federal Financial Markets Service (FFMS).  
He was regarded as a reformer and has implemented several changes to Federal laws to facilitate public offerings in the Russian market. He is a strong supporter of the domestic stock markets and criticised both issuers and investment banks for listing companies with predominantly Russian assets on foreign exchanges without listing in Russia. On May 10, 2007, Vyugin left his position in the Federal Financial Markets Service, succeeded by Vladimir Milovidov.

Chairman of Moscow Exchange 
Mr. Vyugin was elected Chairman of the Supervisory Board of Moscow Exchange in April 2018.

References

More reading 
Federal Financial Markets Service official web-site
Federal Financial Markets Service press-release

Living people
1st class Active State Councillors of the Russian Federation
Russian politicians
1952 births
Academic staff of the Higher School of Economics